Manasa Radhakrishnan is an Indian actress who appears predominantly in Malayalam films.

Personal life
She was born in Ernakulam, Kerala to Radhakrishnan V. K. and Sreekala and was raised in Dubai. She studied till class 10 at The Indian High School, Dubai, and her higher secondary education was at The Choice School in Thrippunithura. She has learnt Indian classical dance, cinematic dance, and guitar. Manasa is currently pursuing Computer Science and Engineering at Muthoot Institute of Technology and Science (MITS).

Career 
Manasa made her acting debut as a child artiste with the 2008 movie  Kannuneerinum Madhuram. She has also appeared in  Kadaksham, Paulettante Veedu, Balasa and Villali Veeran as a child actor. She played a significant role in Tiyaan starring Prithviraj Sukumaran and Indrajith Sukumaran in lead roles. 
She played the female leads in Kaattu and Vikadakumaran. She is set to make her Tamil debut with Paramaguru.

Filmography

Web series

Other works

References

External links
 
 

21st-century Indian child actresses
Actresses from Kochi
Actresses in Malayalam cinema
Actresses in Malayalam television
Actresses in Tamil cinema
Child actresses in Malayalam cinema
Indian film actresses
Living people
Year of birth missing (living people)
Actresses in Telugu cinema